KMXB (94.1 FM, "Mix 94-1") is a commercial radio station licensed to Henderson, Nevada, and serving the Las Vegas radio market.  KMXB airs a hot adult contemporary radio format and is owned by Audacy, Inc.  The station's studios and offices are located in the unincorporated Clark County community of Spring Valley, while its transmitter is atop Black Mountain in Henderson.

KMXB broadcasts in the HD Radio format; its HD2 subchannel carries "Channel Q," an Audacy format of LGBTQ talk and EDM dance music, while its HD3 subchannel carries a simulcast of KDWN.

History

Beautiful music (1971-1994) 
The station signed on the air on February 10, 1971. 
KXTZ was a beautiful music station from 1971 until 1994. The call sign spelled out the moniker "Ecstasy."  KXTZ beat the market's easy listening music competitor KEER-FM 97.1, forcing that station to switch formats in 1984.

Adult contemporary (1994-199?) 
In 1994, KXTZ switched formats. It changed first to Soft Adult Contemporary music.

Urban AC (199?-1996) 
In the mid 1990s, KXTZ call letters switched from KXTZ to KJMZ. During this period, the station aired an Urban AC format. The station was known as "94.1 - Jamz".

Hot adult contemporary (1996-present) 
In 1996, KJMZ became KMXB ("Mix 94.1"). The first song played on KMXB was Nirvana's "Come As You Are." In 1998, KMXB was acquired by Infinity Broadcasting, which later merged with CBS Radio.

In 1999, KMXB's morning drive time show, "Mark and Mercedes in the Morning," appeared on an episode of "Everybody Loves Raymond," a popular TV sitcom. "Mark and Mercedes in the Morning," celebrated their 10-year anniversary in 2007.

On February 2, 2017, CBS Radio announced it would merge with Entercom. The merger was approved on November 9, 2017, and was consummated on the 17th.

In December 2007, KMXB's "Mark & Mercedes in the Morning" scored the first post-rehab interview with Lindsay Lohan in a contest where listeners had to get celebrities to call in for Hannah Montana tickets.

KMXB-HD2

KMXB-HD2 aired an 80s/90s Hits format, branded as "Rewind 94.1," which was previously located on sister station KXTE-HD2.

On October 11, 2018, KMXB-HD2 switched to an LGBTQ talk/EDM format from Entercom, branded as "Out Now". On November 1, 2018, the station rebranded as "Channel Q".

References

External links

MXB
Adult top 40 radio stations in the United States
Hot adult contemporary radio stations in the United States
MXB
Radio stations established in 1971
1971 establishments in Nevada
Audacy, Inc. radio stations